In the Minds of Evil is the eleventh studio album by American death metal band Deicide. It was released on November 25, 2013, by Century Media Records. It was the first album to feature guitarist Kevin Quirion and the last to feature guitarist Jack Owen. The album has been described as moving away from the melodic inclinations of the previous few albums and towards an "old school" death metal sound reminiscent of Legion.

Style
Drummer Steve Asheim observed that the album was "a departure from our recent stuff and has more of an old school vibe. Not quite as melodic and very catchy riffs". Asheim elaborated further, explaining that the band wanted Glen Benton's vocals "to sound more old-school. So, it's a bit of the new with a little throwback action". Benton concurred, observing that Deicide has "settled into a permanent lineup and the writing process now is like the writing process was back in the beginning and we’re all showing up and writing the songs together. Everybody has an input and it shows". Benton cited the addition of guitarist Kevin Quirion as critical to In the Minds of Evil.

Recording
Drummer Steve Asheim noted that producer Jason Suecof "wanted to capture the Legion feel" on In the Minds of Evil.  During the tracking of the album, Asheim revealed that he was performing with "a blown out shoulder. It hurt like hell. It kept dislocating, it was popping and cracking. I just dealt with the pain and got the job done though". Asheim further noted that his approach to drumming on the album was "mostly improvised". He explained in another interview that the composition of the album reflected both preparation and improvisation. "Some vocals and guitar and bass stuff [were improvised]. The song writing – the parts and structures – were all done pre-pro[duction], before we got there. But once we were in and mic'd up, there was a lot of on-the-spot stuff happening. Most of my drum fills were improv[ised]. And I know the fellas just let loose with some on-the-fly kind of stuff together, and you can really hear that. I think the spontaneity and the energy, it really rings through".

Track listing
The song, “In the Minds of Evil”, contains a sample from The Dark Knight (2008).

Personnel

Deicide
 Glen Benton – bass, vocals
 Steve Asheim – drums
 Jack Owen – rhythm guitar
 Kevin Quirion –  lead guitar

Additional personnel
 Jason Suecof – production, engineering, mixing
 Ronn Miller – assistant engineering
 Eyal Levi – assistant mixing
 Alan Douches – mastering
 Simon Cowell – artwork
 Tim Hubbard – photography

References

2013 albums
Deicide (band) albums
Century Media Records albums
Albums produced by Jason Suecof